Maselekwane Modjadji I (died 1854) was the first Rain Queen of the South African Balobedu tribe. Maselekwane reigned from 1800 to 1854. She was succeeded by Rain Queen Masalanabo Modjadji II.

Maselekwane was the daughter of Mugodo, Chief of the Kranga and Princess Dzungundini.

The child who became the first Modjadji was known as Maselekwane Modjadji I. She lived in complete seclusion, deep in the forest where she practiced secretive rituals to make rain. Maselekwane committed ritual suicide by ingesting poison in 1854.

References

1869 births
1959 deaths
Rain Queens
19th-century women rulers
19th-century monarchs in Africa